Yun-suk, also spelled Yoon-sook or Youn-sook, is a Korean feminine given name. Its meaning depends on the hanja used to write each syllable of the name. There are 16 hanja with the reading "yun" and 13 hanja with the reading "suk" on the South Korean government's official list of hanja which may be registered for use in given names.

People with this name include:
Moh Youn-sook (1910–1990), South Korean poet
Hong Yun-suk (born 1925), South Korean poet
Choi Yun-suk (born 1979), South Korean speed skater
Kim Yoon-sook, South Korean badminton player; represented South Korea at the 1984 All England Open Badminton Championships

See also
List of Korean given names

References

External links
Page for the name "윤숙" on erumy.com

Korean feminine given names